The 2010–11 Mestis season was the 11th season of the Mestis, the second level of ice hockey in Finland. 12 teams participated in the league, and Sport won the championship.

Standings

Playoffs
Quarterfinals
Jukurit – K-Vantaa 3–0 on series
D Team – SaPKo 3–1 on series
KooKoo – K-Laser 3–0 on series
Sport – LeKi 3–0 on series
Semifinals
Jukurit – D Team 3–0 on series
Sport – KooKoo 3–1 on series
Final
Sport – Jukurit 3–2 on series
3rd place
D Team – KooKoo 1–0 on series

Qualification

Play-outs

 Hokki – TuTo 2:3

Table

External links
 Season on hockeyarchives.info

Fin
2010–11 in Finnish ice hockey
Mestis seasons